Buthaina bint al-Mu'tamid ibn Abbad was a poet of Al-Andalus. She was born in 1070 and was the daughter of al-Mu'tamid ibn Abbad, ruler of the Taifa of Seville, and his consort Al-Rumaikiyya, an Andalusian poet. One of her poems, "Listen to my words", is about being sold into slavery after her father was overthrown.

References 

Arabic-language women poets
Arabic-language poets
11th-century women writers
Women poets from al-Andalus
Abbadid dynasty
Arabian slaves and freedmen
11th-century Arabs
Medieval slaves
Slaves from al-Andalus